Chamisal is a census-designated place (CDP) in Taos County, New Mexico. It is located along the scenic High Road to Taos. The population was 301 at the time of the 2000 census.

Geography
Chamisal is located at  (36.166127, -105.744224).

Demographics

As of the census of 2000, there were 301 people, 121 households, and 79 families residing in the CDP. The population density was 182.6 people per square mile (70.4/km2). There were 156 housing units at an average density of 94.6 per square mile (36.5/km2). The racial makeup of the CDP was 16.28% White, 0.33% African American, 0.66% Native American, 0.33% Pacific Islander, 76.08% from other races, and 6.31% from two or more races. Hispanic or Latino of any race were 92.03% of the population.

There were 121 households, out of which 26.4% had children under the age of 18 living with them, 49.6% were married couples living together, 11.6% had a female householder with no husband present, and 33.9% were non-families. 31.4% of all households were made up of individuals, and 12.4% had someone living alone who was 65 years of age or older. The average household size was 2.49 and the average family size was 3.18.

In the CDP the population was spread out, with 24.6% under the age of 18, 4.7% from 18 to 24, 25.9% from 25 to 44, 28.6% from 45 to 64, and 16.3% who were 65 years of age or older. The median age was 40 years. For every 100 females there were 98.0 males. For every 100 females age 18 and over, there were 94.0 males.

The median income for a household in the CDP was $18,250, and the median income for a family was $29,286. Males had a median income of $25,357 versus $15,938 for females. The per capita income for the CDP was $8,641. About 18.6% of families and 30.2% of the population were below the poverty line, including 33.7% of those under the age of eighteen and 38.3% of those 65 or over.

Education
The community is in the Peñasco Independent School District.

See also

 List of census-designated places in New Mexico

References

External links

 High Road to Taos Scenic Byway

Census-designated places in Taos County, New Mexico